Max Dorian Fried  (born January 18, 1994), nicknamed "Maximus", is an American professional baseball pitcher for the Atlanta Braves of Major League Baseball (MLB). Drafted in 2012 by the San Diego Padres in the first round, seventh overall, Fried made his major league debut in 2017. His 17 wins in 2019 were 2nd-most in the National League, and his seven wins in 2020 were again 2nd-most in the NL. Through 2021, Fried was second in win–loss percentage of Braves career leaders, at .690. Fried pitched 6 shut-out innings in the final game of the 2021 World Series against the Houston Astros, helping lead the Braves to their first World Series title in 26 years.

In 2020, Fried won the NL Gold Glove Award at pitcher and the Fielding Bible Award at pitcher. In 2021, he won the Gold Glove Award again, as well as the Silver Slugger Award for pitchers, becoming the third pitcher in MLB history to win both awards in the same year. He was also named to the All-MLB Team those two years. In 2022 he was named an All Star, and won his third consecutive Gold Glove Award at pitcher.

Early career
Fried was born and grew up in Santa Monica, California, the middle son of Carrie and Jonathan Fried, and is Jewish.  His younger brother Jake, also a pitcher, attended the University of Arizona. Max began attending the Reggie Smith Baseball Academy in Encino, California, at the age of seven, and learned how to throw a curveball from the retired outfielder. Fried pitched for the 2009 Maccabiah Games Team USA Juniors baseball team that won a gold medal in Israel.

Fried first attended Montclair College Preparatory School, in Van Nuys, Los Angeles, where he played baseball, football, and basketball. As a sophomore, with Ethan Katz as his pitching coach, he was 10–3 with a 1.81 earned run average (ERA), and was named the Olympic League MVP and to the All-California Interscholastic Federation (CIF) Division V first team.  In his junior year Fried was 7–3 with a 1.31 ERA, with 100 strikeouts in 69 innings, as he also played outfield and batted .360 with four home runs and 30 RBIs. He was named the 2011 Southern California Jewish Sports Hall of Fame Male High School Athlete of the Year.

After Montclair Prep cut its baseball team subsequent to his junior year, Fried then transferred to Harvard-Westlake School in Los Angeles, where he wore uniform number 32 in honor of Sandy Koufax and played with fellow future MLB pitchers Lucas Giolito and Jack Flaherty. In 2012, his senior year, Fried was 8–2 with a 2.02 ERA, and 105 strikeouts in 66 innings.  He was a 2012 Rawlings-Perfect Game 1st Team All-American.

Draft and minor leagues

Draft (2012)
The San Diego Padres selected Fried in the first round with the seventh overall selection of the 2012 Major League Baseball draft. Fried chose to sign with the Padres for $3 million despite his commitment to the UCLA Bruins baseball team. Baseball America rated him the top left-hander available in the draft.

San Diego Padres (2012–2014)

Fried made his professional debut for the Arizona League Padres in 2012 and spent the whole season there, going 0–1 with a 3.57 ERA in 17.2 innings pitched. He played for the Fort Wayne TinCaps in 2013 where he compiled a 6–7 record and 3.49 ERA in 23 starts. At the end of the year, Fried was ranked the 43rd-best prospect in the minors by MLBPipeline. He was also named an MiLB.com Padres Organization All Star, and Baseball America ranked his curveball as the best in the Padres' minor league system.

In 2014, he was ranked the Padres' top pitching prospect, and their No. 2 prospect overall, by MLB.com.  Fried was injured for much of the year and did not make his season debut until July. The next month, on August 20, Fried underwent Tommy John surgery; he missed the remainder of the 2014 season.

Atlanta Braves (2014–2017)
On December 19, 2014, the Padres traded Fried, Jace Peterson, Dustin Peterson, and Mallex Smith to the Atlanta Braves in exchange for Justin Upton and Aaron Northcraft. Fried missed the entire 2015 season while recovering from Tommy John surgery.

He returned to action on April 9, 2016, for the Rome Braves. Fried spent all of 2016 with Rome, pitching to an 8–7 record and 3.93 ERA in 21 games (20 starts), striking out 112 batters in 103.0 innings. Fried ended the season ranked by Baseball America as the 6th-best prospect in the South Atlantic League. His fastball, clocked at 93–94 mph, reached 96–97 mph in the second half of the season. The Braves added Fried to their 40-man roster after the season.

Fried was invited to spring training for the first time at the start of the 2017 season. Fried began the season at the Class AA level with the Mississippi Braves. He was ranked as the Braves' No. 8 prospect overall by MLB.com in May, and the #89 prospect in minor league baseball in July. Fried was named Southern League Pitcher of the Week for the week ending April 30.

Major leagues

Atlanta Braves (2017–present)

2017: Major league debut
Fried was called up to the Atlanta Braves on August 5, 2017. He debuted on August 8, throwing two scoreless innings against the Philadelphia Phillies, displaying what David O'Brien of The Atlanta Journal-Constitution called "a devastating curveball". Two weeks later, Fried returned to the minor leagues, joining the AAA Gwinnett Braves. In 26 innings pitched for the Braves for the season, he was 1–1 with a 3.81 ERA.

At the end of the 2017 season, Fried joined the Peoria Javelinas of the Arizona Fall League, for whom he was named league Player of the Week on October 31. He led the league with 32 strikeouts in 26 innings (3rd in the league), and was 3–1 with a 1.73 ERA (6th in the league) in six starts. He ranked first among starters with a .163 opponents' average, was second in fewest-baserunners-allowed-per-nine-innings (7.96), and was named to the AFL's Top Prospects Team. Baseball America rated him # 3 on the AFL Hot Sheet. In December, Braves manager Brian Snitker said that he might look at Fried, Lucas Sims, or another pitcher as the team's fifth starter in 2018.

2018
Fried began the 2018 season with the AA Mississippi Braves. After one game, he joined the Gwinnett Stripers. He was called up to Atlanta in April. In 33.2 innings pitched for the Braves in the 2018 regular season, he was 1–4 with 44 strikeouts and a 2.94 ERA.  With runners in scoring position he kept batters to one hit in 30 at bats (.033); with RISP and two outs, opposing batters were 0-for-14 with eight strikeouts.

2019

Fried was placed in the bullpen at the start of the 2019 season, and later moved to the starting rotation. In a game against the Los Angeles Dodgers on May 7, Fried was hit on his left hand by a batted ball from Alex Verdugo and left the game, but he made his next regularly scheduled start.

In 2019 Fried was 17–6 with a 4.02 ERA, as in 33 games (30 starts) he pitched 165.2 innings in which he struck out 173 batters. His 17 wins were 2nd in the National League, and his .739 won-loss percentage was 5th in the league. He induced the second-lowest percentage of fly balls (22.2%), and the third-highest percentage of ground balls (53.6%), of all NL pitchers, and threw his curveball 24.6% of the time (6th in the league). His 9.398 strikeouts/9 IP were the 5th-highest in a single season of any Braves pitcher in history.

On defense, he led all NL pitchers in assists with 34, and had the 2nd-best range factor/9 innings pitched of 2.23. He had a 6 Defensive Runs Saved (DRS) rating, the best in the major leagues among pitchers. Fried also batted .196 (9th among NL pitchers)/.262 (6th)/.268 (10th), and led all NL pitchers with at least 50 plate appearances in runs (11) and BB/SO ratio (0.31), while having the 2nd-lowest swinging strike percentage (7.1%), 3rd in contact percentage (81.6%), and tying for 3rd in walks (5).

2020: Undefeated, Gold Glove and Fielding Bible Awards, All-MLB First Team
Going into 2020, Freddie Freeman predicted that Fried would be: "phenomenal, better than last year." During the season Fried developed into the ace starting pitcher for the Braves.

His four pickoffs through September 6 were the most in the majors in 2020, and he needed only 12 pickoff attempts to do so. Since his major league debut in 2017, Fried's 14 pickoffs were the most in the majors, and he was successful on 19% of his attempts. In that same time-span, pitchers in all of baseball had been successful in picking off runners in only 0.017% of attempts.

Fried started the season by becoming the first left-handed pitcher to not allow any home runs through eight starts, with his team winning every game, since Babe Ruth in 1917.

In the pandemic-shortened 2020 regular season, Fried was a perfect 7–0 with a 2.25 ERA and a 1.09 WHIP. He led the major leagues in won-loss percentage (1.000) and pickoffs (4), led the National League in WAR for pitchers (2.9), was 2nd in the NL in Wins Above Replacement-all behind Mookie Betts, and tied for 2nd in the NL in wins.  He held batters to an average exit velocity on batted balls of 83.4 mph, and hard-hit balls to 23.8%, both among the lowest 2% of all major league pitchers.

On defense, Fried led all major league pitchers in assists for the second consecutive season (with 15), tied for the MLB lead in pickoffs (with 4; with his 9 in 2019–20 he was tops in major league baseball), and led all pitchers with five Defensive Runs Saved.

Fried won the 2020 NL Gold Glove Award at pitcher. He became the fourth Braves pitcher to win the award, joining Mike Hampton, Greg Maddux, and Phil Niekro, and the first Braves player to win the award for a pitcher in 17 years.

He also won the 2020 Fielding Bible Award at pitcher. The award honors the top fielder in the Major Leagues at pitcher. He came in fifth in voting for the 2020 NL Cy Young Award.

He was named a starter on the 2020 All-MLB First Team.

2021: Silver Slugger and Gold Glove Awards, All-MLB Second Team 

Fried was the Braves' 2021 Opening Day starting pitcher. His first career complete game shutout was a Maddux, pitched against the Baltimore Orioles on August 20, 2021. Fried threw a second Maddux on September 24, while facing the San Diego Padres. His 1.76 ERA and 0.84 WHIP in the second half of the season were the best in the major leagues. He was named the National League Pitcher of the Month for September, after posting a 1.54 ERA.

In the 2021 regular season, Fried was 14–7 with a 3.04 ERA (9th in the National League), and his 14 wins were 5th in the NL. In 28 starts he threw 2 shutouts (leading the league), as in 165.2 innings he averaged 7.5 hits, 0.8 home runs (3rd), and 2.2 walks per 9 innings, for a 1.087 WHIP. His 8.584 strikeouts/9 innings were the 11th-most in Braves history. His 51.8% ground ball percentage was 3rd-highest in the NL, and he induced softly hit balls 20.0% of the time (5th).

As a batter, he hit .273/.322/.327. His batting average and on-base percentage led all pitchers, while his slugging percentage ranked second. He scored 7 runs (2nd), hit three doubles (2nd), and drove in 5 RBIs (6th) in 55 at bats, had the second-highest exit velocity of all pitchers (90.3 mph), had 8 sacrifice hits (8th of all players), and was called upon to pinch hit four times. On July 4, 2021, he had a pinch-hit, walk-off, single against the Miami Marlins.

On defense, Fried led the league in range factor/game as a pitcher (1.61), in assists as a pitcher for the third consecutive season (37), and in Defensive Runs Saved for the third season in a row (6). For the second consecutive season he tied for the major league lead in pickoffs (6).

In the three years in which Fried was a starter, from 2019 to 2021, he led all National League pitchers in wins (38), was tied for the lead in shutouts (2), was 2nd in the vertical movement of his curveball (−11.6 inches; batters hit .183/.218/.294 against it), and had the third-lowest barrels percentage in balls hit against him (5.0%). In those three years on offense he led NL pitchers in runs (18), doubles (7), on base percentage (.292), and WAR (1.3), was 2nd-lowest in strikeout percentage (25.8%), and third in batting average (.234), slugging percentage (.297), OPS (.589), and walks (9). In those three years on defense he led all NL pitchers in assists (86).

Fried won the final game of the 2021 World Series with six shutout innings against the Astros, who had led the majors in batting average and runs for the season, with Houston's three-time batting champion José Altuve observing: "He was almost unhittable."

Fried won the 2021 NL Gold Glove Award at pitcher, winning the award for the second year in a row. He became the third Braves pitcher to win multiple Gold Glove Awards, joining Greg Maddux and Phil Niekro. Major League managers and coaches (voting only within their league, and unable to vote for players on their own team), account for 75% of the selection process, while the other 25 percent is a  sabermetric component.

Fried also won the 2021 NL Silver Slugger Award for pitchers. The award was given to the top offensive player at pitcher in the NL, as determined by a vote by the manager and three coaches of each MLB team (and no manager/coach can vote for a player on his own team). Fried became the third MLB pitcher in history to  win both the Silver Slugger Award and the Gold Glove Award in the same season, joining Mike Hampton (2003) and Zack Greinke (2019). Fried was the final recipient of the Silver Slugger Award for pitchers, as the National League permanently implemented the designated hitter in 2022.

He was named a starter on the 2021 All-MLB Second Team, earning his second consecutive All-MLB selection.

Through 2021, of the Braves career leaders, Fried was second in win–loss percentage (.690; behind Russ Ortiz and ahead of Greg Maddux).

2022: All Star and Gold Glove Award
Fried was named to his second straight Opening Day start in 2022. Fried's salary for the 2022 season was set at $6.85 million via arbitration. He was named to the 2022 Major League Baseball All-Star Game roster at midseason.

For the season, Fried was 14-7 with a 2.48 ERA (3rd in the NL), in 30 starts in which he pitched 185.1 innings with 170 strikeouts. He gave up the lowest percentage of hard-hit balls in the NL (24.5%) and had the lowest barrel-percentage against (4.0%), was 2nd in fewest walks/9 innings (1.55), 3rd in strikeouts/walk (5.31) and fewest home runs/9 innings (0.58), 4th in ground ball percentage (51.2%), and tied for 5th in highest LOB (78.2%). His curveball had the highest vertical movement of those of all NL pitchers, the exit velocity of balls hit against him (86.2 mph) was the third-lowest in the NL, and batters swung at his pitches outside the strike zone 36.8% of the time, the fourth-highest rate in the NL.

In the four seasons from 2019 to 2022, he had the lowest barrel-percentage against (4.6%) of all major league pitchers, and his 52 wins were second in the major leagues only to the 56 wins of pitcher Gerrit Cole.  On defense, opponents have become hesitant to run on him. Since his major league debut in 2017, his 23 pickoffs lead major league baseball, with him having picked the runner off in 14.29% of his career pickoff attempts, a much higher percentage than the major league average of 1.6%.

Fried was named the 2022 NL Gold Glove Award winner at pitcher, his third straight Gold Glove Award. He became the first Braves pitcher since Greg Maddux to win three straight Gold Glove Awards. The only other pitchers who have won the award three times in a row have been Harvey Haddix, Bobby Shantz, Bob Gibson, Phil Niekro, and Zack Greinke. Fried finished second in the voting for the 2022 NL Cy Young Award. It was the second time in three years he finished in the top five in Cy Young Award voting, as he had finished fifth in 2020. At the end of the 2022 season, Fried was selected to his third consecutive All-MLB team.

2023
Fried's 2023 season salary of $13.5 million was again determined by the arbitration process.

Scouting report
Fried throws a 94–96 mph four-seam fastball. He also throws two types of a 74 mph "plus" curveball (which he patterned after that of Sandy Koufax), an 84 mph slider (since 2019), a 93 mph sinker, and an 84 mph change-up, with the curveball resulting in the lowest batting average in 2021 (.160).

See also

 Atlanta Braves award winners and league leaders
 List of baseball players who underwent Tommy John surgery
 List of Major League Baseball annual shutout leaders
 List of select Jewish Major League Baseball players
 List of World Series starting pitchers

References

External links

Living people
1994 births
Arizona League Padres players
Atlanta Braves players
Baseball players from Santa Monica, California
Competitors at the 2009 Maccabiah Games
Fort Wayne TinCaps players
Gold Glove Award winners
Gwinnett Braves players
Gwinnett Stripers players
Harvard-Westlake School alumni
Jewish American baseball players
Jewish Major League Baseball players
Maccabiah Games gold medalists for the United States
Maccabiah Games competitors by sport
Major League Baseball pitchers
Mississippi Braves players
Montclair College Preparatory School alumni
National League All-Stars
Rome Braves players
Silver Slugger Award winners
Peoria Javelinas players
21st-century American Jews